Ground for Suspicion is a 1950 detective novel by the British writer Cecil Street, writing under the pen name of Miles Burton. It was part of a lengthy series of books featuring the detective Desmond Merrion and Inspector Arnold of Scotland Yard. Maurice Richardson writing in The Observer considered it " Readable enough in its old-fashioned, consequential style.".

Synopsis
Looking for a break from crime-solving Merrion heads on holiday with his wife to the seaside town of Shellmouth. Before he has been there more than a few days, however, three suspicious deaths have occurred and with Scotland Yard called in he join with Arnold to solve the mysteries.

References

Bibliography
 Evans, Curtis. Masters of the "Humdrum" Mystery: Cecil John Charles Street, Freeman Wills Crofts, Alfred Walter Stewart and the British Detective Novel, 1920-1961. McFarland, 2014.
 Herbert, Rosemary. Whodunit?: A Who's Who in Crime & Mystery Writing. Oxford University Press, 2003.
 Reilly, John M. Twentieth Century Crime & Mystery Writers. Springer, 2015.

1950 British novels
Novels by Cecil Street
British mystery novels
British detective novels
Collins Crime Club books
Novels set in England